George Cole Field was a ballpark located in Fayetteville, Arkansas, United States, and served as the home of the Arkansas Razorbacks baseball program for two decades until Baum Stadium opened in 1996.  The ballpark is named after former Razorbacks baseball player, George Cole.

References

Baseball venues in Arkansas
Defunct college baseball venues in the United States
Arkansas Razorbacks baseball
Defunct sports venues in Arkansas
Southwest Conference Baseball Tournament venues
University of Arkansas buildings
University and college buildings completed in 1975
1975 establishments in Arkansas